The Rural Municipality of Fish Creek No. 402 is a rural municipality (RM) in the Canadian province of Saskatchewan within Census Division No. 15 and  Division No. 5.

History 
The RM of Fish Creek No. 402 incorporated as a rural municipality on January 1, 1913.

Geography

Communities and localities 
The following urban municipalities are surrounded by the RM.

Villages
 Alvena

The following unincorporated communities are within the RM.

Localities
 Carpenter
 Fish Creek
 Sokal

Demographics 

Attractions 
 Fish Creek (Saskatchewan)
 Battle of Fish Creek
 Seager Wheeler Farm
 Wakaw Heritage Museum & Diefenbaker Law Office
 Our Lady of Lourdes Shrine
 Duck Lake Regional Interpretive Center
 Batoche National Historic Site
 Wakaw Lake Regional Park

Government 
The RM of Fish Creek No. 402 is governed by an elected municipal council and an appointed administrator that meets on the first Tuesday of every month. The reeve of the RM is Brian Domotor while its administrator is Gartner Lois. The RM's office is located in Wakaw.

Transportation 
 Saskatchewan Highway 2
 Saskatchewan Highway 41
 Saskatchewan Highway 312

See also 
List of rural municipalities in Saskatchewan

References 

F

Division No. 15, Saskatchewan